Wierzchoniów  is a village in the administrative district of Gmina Kazimierz Dolny, within Puławy County, Lublin Voivodeship, in eastern Poland.

References

Villages in Puławy County